Swami (sometimes abbreviated sw.) in Hinduism is an honorific title given to a male or female ascetic who has chosen the path of renunciation (sanyāsa), or has been initiated into a religious monastic order of Vaishnavas. It is used either before or after the subject's name (usually an adopted religious name).

The meaning of the Sanskrit root of the word swami is "[he who is] one with his self" ( stands for "self"), and can roughly be translated as "he/she who knows and is master of himself/herself". The term is often attributed to someone who has achieved mastery of a particular yogic system or demonstrated profound devotion (bhakti) to one or more Hindu gods. The Oxford English Dictionary gives the etymology as:

As a direct form of address, or as a stand-in for a swami's name, it is often rendered Swamiji (also Swami-ji or Swami Ji). 

In modern Gaudiya Vaishnavism, Swami is also one of the 108 names for a sannyasi given in Bhaktisiddhanta Sarasvati's Gaudiya Kanthahara, along with Goswami, also traditionally used as an honorific title.

Swami is also the surname of the Bairagi caste in Haryana, Uttar Pradesh, and Rajasthan. In Bengali, the word (pronounced ), while carrying its original meaning, also has the meaning of "husband" in another context. The word also means "husband" in Malay, in which it is spelled , and in Khmer, Assamese and Odiya.

See also
 Dashanami Sampradaya

References 

Honorifics
Indian culture
Sanskrit words and phrases
Titles and occupations in Hinduism